AASU and Aasu may refer to:

All Assam Students Union, a students' organization in Assam, India
Armstrong State University, a state university located in Savannah, Georgia formerly known as Armstrong Atlantic State University
Aasu, American Samoa, village on Tutuila Island, American Samoa
Aasu, Estonia, village in Haljala Parish, Lääne-Viru County, Estonia